Les Cayes, often referred to as Aux Cayes, is a commune and seaport in the Les Cayes Arrondissement, in the Sud department of Haiti, with a population of 71,236. Due to its isolation from the political turmoil of the capital, Port-au-Prince, it is one of Haiti's major ports, with export trade concentrating on mostly coffee and sugarcane. As the world's largest supplier of vetiver, it exports 250 tons annually of this ingredient of perfume and fragrance manufacturing. Minor exports include bananas and timber.

History
The island of what was known by the Spanish as Hispaniola was inhabited for thousands of years by indigenous peoples.  The first European settlement in the southwest area was the town of Salvatierra de la Sabana, founded by the Spanish explorer Diego Velázquez de Cuéllar in 1504. Vasco Núñez de Balboa was a co-founder of this town and lived there for several years trying to raise pigs as a business. Balboa gave up that enterprise and left the town hiding in a barrel of a Spanish expedition going to explore the Gulf of Uraba, Panama. Vasco Núñez de Balboa, later on 25 September 1513 would discover the South Sea, today known as the Pacific Ocean. This settlement was abandoned in 1540.

The area was uninhabited until the French colonial administration founded the town of Aux Cayes ("On the cayes"), so named due to its proximity to Île-à-Vache. The town was destroyed twice by hurricanes in 1781 and 1788. In July 1793, the whites in Les Cayes were massacred.

Simón Bolívar twice went to Les Cayes, in 1815 and 1816, seeking assistance from President Alexander Petion for his insurgency against the Spanish colonial government in Venezuela.

In December 1929, during the United States occupation of Haiti, Marines fired upon and killed Haitians protesting poor economic and social conditions under U.S. rule.

In the wake of the 12 January 2010 earthquake, the Cuban military set up a field hospital in the region.

On 4 October 2016, Hurricane Matthew made landfall in Les Cayes causing severe damage.

On 14 August 2021, a magnitude 7.2 earthquake occurred near the city. It was the largest earthquake to strike Haiti in modern history, even stronger than the 2010 earthquake near the Haitian capital. The earthquake killed over 2,200 people and injured around 12,700 others, most of them in Les Cayes and its surrounding areas.

Tourism 
Les Cayes plays a significant role in the still under-developed Haitian tourism industry, with pleasant sights such as:
Gelée Beach: one of the longest and most visited beaches in Haiti. The white sand beach of Gelée beach is very popular in Haiti, not only for its restaurants which serve typical southern Haiti dishes such as tonm-tonm, grilled-conch, grilled-fish and lobster, but also for hosting an annual music festival around mid-August which usually features some of the best Compas music bands. Many visitors both from within Haiti and neighboring USA will come spend the weekend in Les Cayes. As the number of tourists continues to grow, several new hotels and restaurants continue to pop up.

The Botanical Garden of Les Cayes  (Jardin Botanique des Cayes, in French) is located in Bergeau, at the northern entrance of the city. The site occupies an area of eight (8) hectares.
Other places of interest to tourists are the nearby Île à Vache, Pic Macaya, Saut-Mathurine falls and Kounoubois cave in Camp-Perrin, Pointe-de-Sable beach in Port-Salut, Marie-Jeanne cave in Port-a-Piment and   Arrondissement Aquin where Fort des Oliviers, Fort Anglais and Bonnet Carré can be found in the town of Saint Louis du Sud.

Facilities

Airport 
Les Cayes has an airport, Antoine-Simon Airport. As of 1 February 2013, the first stone on the expansion project of the Antoine-Simon Airport in Les Cayes had been laid. The project to make Antoine-Simon a viable international airport is part of broader efforts aiming at ramping up infrastructure development in the south.

The expansion project will add a new 3,000-metre runway and a new terminal to the airport. Haitian officials Prime Minister Laurent Lamothe and Tourism Minister Stéphanie Villedrouin suggested that the airport would open up completely the Southern Region as the country saw tourism as one of the promising sectors capable of creating thousands of new jobs in the region.

Another airport project is also planned for the neighbouring island of Île-à-Vache.

University
Les Cayes has some training centers of which The American University of the Caribbean, Haiti; The Public University of The South in Les Cayes, (UPSAC); and 
The Law and Economics School of Les Cayes (EDSEC).

Hospital
Hôpital Immaculée Conception (Immaculate Conception Hospital, also referred to as HIC-Cayes), is the public hospital for Les Cayes and the South Department. Its facilities include an emergency department, maternity ward, and a dental clinic.

Sport

Les Cayes is home to professional football clubs, America des Cayes and FC Juventus des Cayes.

Notable natives and residents 
 John James Audubon, French-American naturalist
 Euphémie Daguilh, Royal mistress to the Haitian emperor Jean-Jacques Dessalines
 Auguste Davezac, United States Ambassador to the Netherlands
 André Corvington, Olympic fencer
 André Rigaud, Haitian revolutionary leader, was born here on a plantation.
 Assotto Saint, writer and artist
 Horace Pauleus Sannon (1870-1938) was a Haitian historian and politician and presidential candidate in 1926 and 1930

References

External links 

 Les Cayes-related website 
 "Port-Salut: bien sur, mais...", Le Nouvelliste, in French, article on differences between Les Cayes and Port Salut

 
Populated places in Sud (department)
Communes of Haiti
Port cities in the Caribbean